Parco di Centocelle is an underground station of Line C of the Rome Metro. It is located near the intersection between the Via Casilina and Via Palmiro Togliatti. It is the last station of Line C following the route of the former Rome–Giardinetti railway. Parco di Centocelle serves as an important interchange between the public transportation corridors of Via Casilina and Via Togliatti.

Construction of the station started in 2007 and it was opened on 9 November 2014. It served as a temporary western terminus of Line C until the opening of Lodi station in June 2015.

References

External links

Rome Metro Line C stations
Railway stations opened in 2014
2014 establishments in Italy
Rome Q. XIX Prenestino-Centocelle
Rome Q. XXIII Alessandrino
Rome Q. XXIV Don Bosco
Railway stations in Italy opened in the 21st century